Chin State Government is the cabinet of Chin State. The cabinet is led by chief minister, Salai Lian Luai.

Cabinet (April 2016–present)

References

State and region governments of Myanmar
Chin State